Giorgio Vinella (born 22 August 1973 in Putignano) is an Italian racing driver.

Career history
Giorgio Vinella’s racing career starts in the early ‘90s driving go-kart in the category 100cc National, while in 1993 he debuted with Henry Morrogh’s single-seater car. The brilliant debut was highlighted being rewarded by Autosprint as most promising driver in the race and in Giorgio Vinella started racing in the British Formula Ford Championship.

In 1995 Giorgio won races in the French Formula Ford Championship with his Vector 95, came second in the prestigious Formula Ford Festival and finished third in the European Championship. In 1996 and 1997 he moved to Formula Renault, and a year later joined the Coloni team in Formula 3000. In 1999 he became champion in the Italian Formula 3000 championship racing for Team Martello. The victory in the championship allowed him to test the Minardi and in December 1999 at Jerez will make an impressive test that earned him the position of test driver for year 2000.

In 2000, follows the Minardi Team as test driver doing aerodynamic testing at the Mugello and Vairano. Also in 2000 will do one race in Formula 3000 with Team Da Vinci and a race in the Grand Am series at Elkhart Lake in United States with a Riley & Scott with a Chevrolet engine. After 8 years of non racing, he returns to the 500 Italian Championship winning the race in Vallelunga.

In 2009 he wins the Italian Touring Car Endurance Championship together with Marco Baroncini, driving a BMW 320i E36 run by Pai Technosport. In the year 2010 Giorgio Vinella makes 2 races in Czech Republic in Brno and Most with a Porsche 996 GT3, makes a test with the Audi R10 TDI with the Team Kolles for candidacy of a seat for the 24 Hours of Le Mans, wins his Class in the 6 hours of Misano, wins a race at the Mugello circuit in the Italian CITS with the Mini of the Roberto Ravaglia's ROAL Motorsport team. At the end of the 2010 disputes a race in the European Sports Prototype with the prototype Wolf of BF Motorsport Team coming third at the finish. In 2011 he won another title in the Italian Endurance Touring Car Championship Ibiza Cup with Marco Baroncini winning 4 races and finishing on the podium 8 times. The year 2012 began with the third place in their class at the 12 Hours of Abu Dhabi driving the prototype Wolf. After some years of absence from racing Giorgio got a great victory at the 3 hours of Imola with a Wolf prototype together with the Italian driver Luca Pirri, in the LP Racing Team. In 2021 he made only one race with the Ferrari 458 GT Cup with the SR&R Team in the Italian 3 hours GT held in Mugello arriving third in his class. Outside of racing, Giorgio continues with his job as Driving Instructor, Drivers Coaching and he also created and developed an ONLINE course to allow anyone to learn how to drive correctly following all the driving techniques used by racing drivers, called Drivers Masterclass. 

Translated with www.DeepL.com/Translator (free version)

References

External links

1973 births
Living people
People from Putignano
Italian racing drivers
Sportspeople from the Metropolitan City of Bari
Scuderia Coloni drivers
International Formula 3000 drivers